Gao Fangjie (born 29 September 1998) is a Chinese badminton player from Nanjing, Jiangsu. She was part of the Chinese junior team to win the gold medals at the 2015, and 2016 World Junior; and also at the 2016 Asia Junior Championships. In 2016 Asia, she won the bronze medal in the girls' singles event. Gao was the runner-up in the senior tournament at the 2016 China International Challenge. In 2017, she reach the final round at the BWF Superseries Premier tournament at the China Open after competed from the qualification round, and beat the seeded players Nozomi Okuhara, P. V. Sindhu and Carolina Marín.

Achievements

Asian Junior Championships 
Girls' singles

BWF World Tour (1 title, 1 runner-up) 
The BWF World Tour, which was announced on 19 March 2017 and implemented in 2018, is a series of elite badminton tournaments sanctioned by the Badminton World Federation (BWF). The BWF World Tour is divided into levels of World Tour Finals, Super 1000, Super 750, Super 500, Super 300 (part of the HSBC World Tour), and the BWF Tour Super 100.

Women's singles

BWF Superseries (1 runner-up) 
The BWF Superseries, which was launched on 14 December 2006 and implemented in 2007, was a series of elite badminton tournaments, sanctioned by the Badminton World Federation (BWF). BWF Superseries levels were Superseries and Superseries Premier. A season of Superseries consisted of twelve tournaments around the world that had been introduced since 2011. Successful players were invited to the Superseries Finals, which were held at the end of each year.

Women's singles

  BWF Superseries Finals tournament
  BWF Superseries Premier tournament
  BWF Superseries tournament

BWF Grand Prix (1 title) 
The BWF Grand Prix had two levels, the Grand Prix and Grand Prix Gold. It was a series of badminton tournaments sanctioned by the Badminton World Federation (BWF) and played between 2007 and 2017.

Women's singles

  BWF Grand Prix Gold tournament
  BWF Grand Prix tournament

BWF International Challenge/Series (2 titles, 1 runner-up) 
Women's singles

  BWF International Challenge tournament
  BWF International Series tournament

References

External links 
 

1998 births
Living people
Badminton players from Jiangsu
Sportspeople from Nanjing
Chinese female badminton players
Badminton players at the 2018 Asian Games
Asian Games silver medalists for China
Asian Games medalists in badminton
Medalists at the 2018 Asian Games